Jean-Michel Carboni (born 23 July 1955) is a French Chief Executive Officer, senior official and senior executive in the energy sector, for EDF-GDF, Gaz de France and Engie (€65 billion in 2017) groups. Member of the management committee (Top 15) he is Deputy CEO (in charge of IT services) of Engie in 2013.

Family and education
On his mother's side, Carboni is the descendant of the Michau family, belonging to the aristocracy and the upper bourgeoisie from Orléans in Centre-Val de Loire region. With personalities such as Joseph-Alexandre Michau (1815-1873), industrialist and mayor of Saint-Pryvé-Saint-Mesmin; Charles-Louis Michau (1835-1908), treasurer and manager of the Savings Bank of Loiret department, then deputy mayor of Orléans and also member of the Académie des Arts, Sciences et Belles Lettres; André Michau (1895-1972), senior military officer of the French Armed Forces Health service, Administration's Lieutenant (9th Military Region) during the Second World War, and decorated in 1948 by French government as a knight of the Legion of Honor.

Son of Michel Carboni (a Corsican senior customs officer) and Germaine Michau, Carboni grew up in the south of France. Then he came in Paris to study and he graduated in "Finance-Accounting" from ESCP Europe business school, "Sup de Co Paris" (1977 class).

Career

 Carboni began his career in French diplomacy as advisor to the Commercial Counsellor of the French Embassy in Oslo (Norway) and then as Trade attaché at French Embassy of Athens (Greece). He came back in France to work at Nestlé's marketing department, before joining in 1979 the SAPAR subsidiary of French public group EDF-GDF (EDF: Électricité de France and GDF: Gaz de France today Engie). In SAPAR (Financial Controlling firm of EDF) subsidiary, Carboni is CFO of French nuclear power stations, including Creys-Malville power plant. Then he joined GDF's Finance department as Chief of the Treasury and of the Trading room (management of assets and debt : €15 billion). In collaboration with CFO Robert Delbos, they modernized EDF-GDF's financial functioning, managed the second biggest Swaps portfolio right after the World Bank and be pioneers in term of raising funds.

In 1997, Carboni took over as CEO of COFATHEC Italy (€300M of turnover, 3,000 employees) and later CEO of COFATHEC group today renamed ENGIE Cofely (€2,8bn of turnover in 2018) and between 2001-03 he is the Delegate General of the e-compagnie (in charge of new technologies, internet, intranet, e-purchasing). He came back in 2004 at GDF's Finance department to manage the purchase of Romanian group DistriGaz Sud (€500M, 10,000 employees). Then he was appointed CFO of CNIEG (National Pension Fund of Electricity and Gas Industries) to restructure IEG pension fund (with €1 billion of financing).

Between 2005-07 he is CFO and CEO of Gaz de France CEE (Central and Eastern Europe) in charge of subsidiaries as Égáz-Dégáz, DistriGaz, etc.

After the merger of Gaz de France and Suez in 2008, GDF Suez was born and Carboni became CEO of the Italian Business Unit (GDF Suez Italy), today known as Engie Italy (revenue 2009 : €1.4 billion and two million customers). This Business Unit gathers power plants, gas networks, storage centres and renewable energy.

Between 2010-12 Carboni was in charge of the DSI : GDF Suez's IT department (€1.35 billion in 2012) with the mission to pool IT services and to create ENGIE IT (at that time GDF Suez IT) with a launch capital of €45 million. In 2013, ENGIE IT is the major IT (Information & Technologies) subsidiary of European continent with a turnover of €600 million and 2,700 employees. Carboni is the CEO of ENGIE IT between 2012-15.

In 2016, Carboni is a special adviser of Isabelle Kocher (CEO) and Gérard Mestrallet (Chairman) of Engie group.

In 2018, he is the co-Founder and Chairman of an advisory firm specialized in renewable energies.

Personal life
He is the father of three children, including the producer and entrepreneur Jérémie Carboni.

References

External links

  Official website of Efthia Consulting.
  Engie website.

1955 births
Living people
ESCP Europe alumni
French businesspeople